Catarraphia is a genus of fungi within the Arthoniales order. The genus has not been placed into a family. This is a monotypic genus, containing the single species Catarraphia dictyoplaca.

References

Arthoniomycetes
Lichen genera
Monotypic Ascomycota genera
Taxa named by Abramo Bartolommeo Massalongo
Taxa described in 1860